Dhaka Imperial College (DIC) is a co-educational Bangladeshi private college situated in Dhaka, Bangladesh established at 1995.

History
Dhaka Imperial College was established in November 1995 at New Market, Dhaka opposite of Dhaka College, then transfer to Badda, Dhaka in 2012 on their own campus.

Founders
Dhaka Imperial College was founded in November 1995 by some educationists and social workers person including M. A. Malek (established secretary), Waliullah, Mahafuzul Haque (ex-principal who died in 2013) and others.

Academics
Dhaka Imperial College offers H.S.C., four years Honours in various majors.

H.S.C
 Science
 Business Studies
 Humanity
 Music

Honours
 Bangla Department (Under National University)
 English Department (Under National University)
 Accounting Department (Under National University)
 Management Department (Under National University)
 Marketing Department (Under National University)

Students
Every year Dhaka Imperial College admits around 1000 students in science, 200 students in Humanities and 800 students in Business Studies group through the admission process in the country. With a few number of GPA holders in Public Examination (SSC), Dhaka Imperial College accepts students with mid-range GPAs holders in various faculty. Currently, it consists of 16 classrooms for boys & girls students in science terming each as "Groups". In case of science, groups A to L without 'G' includes boys and the rest 'G' divided into four sections G-1, G-2, G-3 and G-4 are for girls students. Humanities has groups A-1 and A-2 with combine while the Business Studies section has groups A-1, A-2 B-1, B-2.

Clubs
Dhaka Imperial College has 18 extracurricular clubs including:
 Imperial Debating Club (IDC)
 Imperial Science World (ISW)
 Imperial Nandon Kanon
 Imperial Information Technology Club (IITC)
 Imperial English Language Club (IELC)
 Imperial Rover Scouts (IRS)
 Imperial Tour Club (ITC)
 Imperial Business Club (IBC)
 Imperial Phatchakra
 Imperial Carrier Guidance Club (ICGC)
 Imperial Sports Club (ISC)
 Imperial Photographers Club (IPC)
 Imperial Theater (IT)
 Imperial Earth
 Protivar Shondhana Imperial
 Imperial Ghaan Ornation
 Imperial Shomajsheba O Shashaamulok Club

Imperial Debating Club (IDC)
Imperial Debating Club (IDC) was established in 1995 at the time of the beginning of the college.

Imperial Science World (ISW)
Imperial Science World is the first science club in this college. It was established in 1998 by Professor Mahafuzul Haque, Ex-principal of Dhaka Imperial College and also the founder of most of the club in the college.

Imperial Tour Club (ITC)
Imperial Tour Club also known as ITC is one of the major clubs in the college. Every year at the middle of the session this club arranges a tour of Bangladesh for seven days to tourist areas including Sundarban, Cox's Bazar, Bandarban, Rangamati and more. After study tour it also arranges another big arrangement in February named "Banvoson & Basanto Utsho" outside of Dhaka, specifically Gazipur for all students of the college. Sometimes it arranges a tour need 'SAARC Tour' to SAARC included country (without Pakistan and Afghanistan) with a few teachers and students.

Imperial Nandon Kanon 

Imperial Nandon Kanon is said to ne the most active club in Dhaka Imperial College. Every year one the biggest ceremony in the college, "Nobin Boron," is fully arranged by the help of the club for the new student. Every culture-related program is arranged with help of this club. Every year it publishes its annual magazine.

Imperial English Language Club (IELC)

Imperial English Language Club, also known as IELC, is the major English based club in Dhaka Imperial College. It arranges a major course in English development in 10 long class around a year for developing speaking and free writing in English for the students of the college.

Labs
This college has one of the latest lab facilities from any other private college in Dhaka City. They rebuild their lab and upgrade it to a modern lab in the middle of the year 2018.
 Physics lab
 Chemistry lab
 Biology lab
 Computer lab

References

External links
 

Academic institutions associated with the Bengal Renaissance
Colleges in Dhaka District
Universities and colleges in Dhaka
Educational institutions established in 1995
Dhaka Imperial College
1995 establishments in Bangladesh